Michael David-Fox (born 21 May 1965) is an American historian who studies modern Russia and the Soviet Union.

Biography
David-Fox received his A.B. from Princeton University and his Ph.D. from Yale.

David-Fox has been a professor at the Higher School of Economics since 2014, and director of the Center for Eurasian, Russian and East European Studies in Georgetown University's Walsh School of Foreign Service. He is a founding editor of Kritika: Explorations in Russian and Eurasian History, for which he received the 2010 Distinguished Editor Award from the Council of Editors of Learned Journals.

He has been a fellow, visiting professor, and honorary professor in France, Germany, and Russia, and Kennan Institute member. In 2017, he was awarded a fellowship at the John Simon Guggenheim Memorial Foundation for his study of European and Latin American history.

As of 2021, he is the author of several books, nine edited volumes, twelve edited special theme issues of peer-reviewed academic journals, and about 50 articles and chapters.

Bibliography

Articles

Books

Chapters

Essays

Reviews

References

External links 
 Google Scholar
 Humanities Commons

1965 births
20th-century American historians
21st-century American historians
Historians of Russia
Living people